This is a list of earthquakes in 1950. Only magnitude 6.0 or greater earthquakes appear on the list. Lower magnitude events are included if they have caused death, injury or damage. Events which occurred in remote areas will be excluded from the list as they wouldn't have generated significant media interest. All dates are listed according to UTC time. The main event which dominated the year in terms of magnitude and deaths was the earthquake which struck India in August. With a magnitude of 8.6, it was one of the largest earthquakes of all time, and affected the eastern part of the country. There were 1,530 deaths, which was around three quarters of the yearly total. A number of other deadly events struck Venezuela and Peru. There were 21 magnitude 7.0+ quakes. Aside from India, Chile was hit by a magnitude 8.2 event in December that left one person dead. Aftershock sequences contributed to a large number of magnitude 6.0–6.9 events, especially in India and Vanuatu (which also saw four magnitude 7.0+ quakes).

Overall

By death toll 

 Note: At least 10 casualties

By magnitude 

 Note: At least 7.0 magnitude

Notable events

January

February

March

April

May

June

July

August

September

October

November

December

References

1950
 
1950